Thibaudeau v Canada, [1995] 2 SCR 627 was one of a trilogy of equality rights cases published by a divided Supreme Court of Canada in the spring of 1995. The Court held that the provisions of the Income Tax Act requiring an ex-wife to include among her taxable income amounts received from ex-husband as alimony for maintenance of children is not a violation of the ex-wife's equality rights under Section 15 of the Canadian Charter of Rights and Freedoms.

See also
 List of gender equality lawsuits
 List of Supreme Court of Canada cases (Lamer Court)

Notes

External links
 full text from LexUM
 case summary from mapleleafweb.com

Section Fifteen Charter case law
Supreme Court of Canada cases
1995 in Canadian case law
Child support
Gender discrimination lawsuits